Pauletta Foppa (born 22 December 2000) is a French handball player for Brest Bretagne Handball and the French national team.

Awards and recognition
 All-Star Pivot at the Olympic Games: 2020
All-Star Pivot of the EHF Champions League: 2021
All-Star Pivot of the Youth European Championship: 2017
 Best Young Player of the EHF Champions League: 2022
 All-Star Pivot of the World Championship: 2021
 All-Star Pivot of the European Championship: 2022

References

External links

2000 births
Living people
French female handball players
Sportspeople from Loiret
European champions for France
Handball players at the 2020 Summer Olympics
Medalists at the 2020 Summer Olympics
Olympic gold medalists for France
Olympic medalists in handball